The 2016 Proposition 63, titled Firearms and Ammunition Sales, is a California ballot proposition that passed on the November 8, 2016 ballot. It requires a background check and California Department of Justice authorization to purchase ammunition, prohibits possession of high-capacity ammunition magazines over ten rounds, levies fines for failing to report when guns are stolen or lost, establishes procedures for enforcing laws prohibiting firearm possession by specified persons, and requires California Department of Justice's participation in the federal National Instant Criminal Background Check System.

Supporters of the measure stated that it would “fix a major flaw” put in place by the passing of Proposition 47 in 2014 by stating that theft of a firearm is a felony, regardless of its monetary value.

A September 2016 poll from USC Dornsife / Los Angeles Times showed 64% percent of registered voters in favor of Proposition 63, 28% opposed, and 8% unknown. A November 2016 poll from Insights West showed 57% percent of likely voters in favor of Proposition 63, 35% opposed, and 8% undecided.

Proposition 63 passed, 63% to 37%.

Federal court cases

Duncan v. Bonta
In March 2019, in the case Duncan v. Becerra (currently Duncan v. Bonta), the Federal District Court stayed enforcement of the new law as the state failed to show how this law didn't violate the Second Amendment or the property rights of owners of previously legal goods.  On March 29, 2019, Judge Roger Benitez of the United States District Court for the Southern District of California ruled Proposition 63 unconstitutional, citing lawful defensive use of firearms across the state of California, specifically in the hands of women.

Benitez stated that various violent crimes were far more common than mass shootings, and people can use firearms to defend themselves from them providing the law allows it, giving several examples in the first few pages of the opinion. "As in the year 2017, in 2016 there were numerous robberies, rapes, and murders of individuals in California and no mass shootings. Nevertheless, a gubernatorial candidate was successful in sponsoring a statewide ballot measure (Proposition 63).  Californians approved the proposition and added criminalization and dispossession elements to existing law prohibiting a citizen from acquiring and keeping a firearm magazine that is able to hold more than 10 rounds.  The State now defends the prohibition on magazines, asserting that mass shootings are an urgent problem and that restricting the size of magazines a citizen may possess is part of the solution.

In August 2020, a three-judge panel of the U.S. Court of Appeals for the Ninth Circuit, in a 2–1 decision, upheld the district court's ruling. California Attorney General Xavier Becerra successfully petitioned for en banc rehearing by a wider 11-judge panel of the court. Duncan v. Bonta was heard en banc by the Ninth Circuit Court on June 22, 2021. The en banc Court overturned the lower appellate panel in its ruling, holding that California's regulation of firearms did not violate the 2nd Amendment.

Rhode v. Becerra
The case Rhode v. Becerra is challenging Proposition 63's requirement for background checks to purchase ammunition as well as its prohibition against importation of ammunition into the state by residents, unless importation takes place through a licensed ammunition dealer. On April 22, 2020, Judge Roger Benitez of the United States District Court for the Southern District of California struck down the requirement and prohibition, stating “California’s new ammunition background check law misfires and the Second Amendment rights of California citizens have been gravely injured.” California's Attorney General Xavier Becerra filed for and was granted a stay of the injunction to appeal the decision to the United States Court of Appeals for the Ninth Circuit.

See also
 Gun laws in California
 High-capacity magazine

References

External links 
 
 No on 63 Coalition for Civil Liberties

2016 California ballot propositions